Robert E. Parsons (April 15, 1892 – July 1966) was an American politician who was the 90th lieutenant governor of Connecticut from 1948 to 1949.

Early life
Robert E. Parsons was born in Unionville, Farmington, Hartford County, Connecticut, April 15, 1892. He was an Automobile dealer in Farmington. There still is a Robert E. Parsons Chevrolet Dealership in Farmington.

Political career
Parsons was a Republican and was a member of the Connecticut House of Representatives from Farmington from 1933 to 1940. He was a member of the Connecticut Senate for the 5th District from 1943 to 1945. He served as President pro tempore of the Connecticut Senate.

On March 7, 1948, when James C. Shannon succeeded James L. McConaughy as Governor of Connecticut upon the death of the former, Parsons succeeded Shannon as Lieutenant Governor of Connecticut. Shannon and Parsons served for the remainder of the gubernatorial term, which ended on January 5, 1949.

Parsons died in 1966.

See also
List of governors of Connecticut

References

1892 births
1966 deaths
Lieutenant Governors of Connecticut
Presidents pro tempore of the Connecticut Senate
20th-century American politicians